The Roman Catholic Diocese of Nogales is a Latin bishopric of the Roman Catholic Church.

It is a suffragan of the Metropolitan Archdiocese of Hermosillo, from which it was branched off in 2015. Its episcopal cathedral see is the Catedral Santuario de Nuestra Señora de Guadalupe, in the city of (Heroica) Nogales, a municipal county seat in the Mexican state of Sonora.

History 
It was established on 19 March 2015, when its diocesan territory was split off from its present Metropolitan, the Archdiocese of Hermosillo.

Episcopal incumbents 
 José Leopoldo González González (2015.03.19 – ...)

See also
Catholic Church in Mexico

References

External links
 GigaCatholic, with incumbent biographies

Roman Catholic dioceses in Mexico
Roman Catholic Ecclesiastical Province of Hermosillo